The 1912 United States presidential election in Pennsylvania took place on November 5, 1912 as part of the 1912 United States presidential election. This was the first time that Arizona and New Mexico took part in a presidential election having been admitted to the Union earlier in the year. Voters chose 38 representatives, or electors to the Electoral College, who voted for president and vice president.

This election was a 4-way contest. Pennsylvania voted for the Progressive nominee former President Theodore "Teddy" Roosevelt over the Democratic nominee New Jersey Governor Woodrow Wilson, Republican nominee President William Howard Taft, and Socialist Party of America nominee union leader Eugene V. Debs. Roosevelt won Pennsylvania by a margin of 4.04%. He also became the first non-Republican candidate to win the Keystone State since Democratic candidate and native son James Buchanan won the state in 1856. , this is the last election in which Wayne County, Snyder County, and Union County did not vote for the Republican candidate.

Results

Results by county

See also
 List of United States presidential elections in Pennsylvania

Notes

References

Pennsylvania
1912
1912 Pennsylvania elections